Polling was conducted separately in the constituent countries of the United Kingdom. Of the 650 seats in the House of Commons, England had 533, Scotland had 59, Wales had 40 and Northern Ireland had 18.

England

Scotland

Wales

Northern Ireland

London

See also
 Opinion polling for the 2015 United Kingdom general election

Notes

References

2015 United Kingdom general election
Opinion polling in the United Kingdom
Opinion polling for elections